Donald Becker is an American computer programmer who wrote Ethernet drivers for the Linux operating system. 

Becker, in collaboration with Thomas Sterling, created the  Beowulf clustering software while at NASA, to connect many inexpensive PCs to solve complex math problems typically reserved for classic supercomputers. For this work, Becker received the Gordon Bell Prize in 1997. 

Becker became the Chief Technology Officer (CTO) of Scyld Computer Corporation, a wholly owned subsidiary of Penguin Computing, a developer and supplier of Beowulf clusters.

References

External links 
 Scyld Computer Corporation

Free software programmers
American chief technology officers
Year of birth missing (living people)
Living people